Costanza Cocconcelli (born 26 January 2002) is an Italian swimmer. She competed in the women's 4 × 100 metre freestyle relay event at the 2020 European Aquatics Championships, in Budapest, Hungary, reaching the final.

References

External links

2002 births
Living people
Italian female swimmers
Italian female freestyle swimmers
Sportspeople from Bologna
Medalists at the FINA World Swimming Championships (25 m)
21st-century Italian women